The 2009 FedEx BCS National Championship Game was an American football game played at Dolphin Stadium in Miami Gardens, Florida, on January 8, 2009.  It was the national championship game for the 2008 NCAA Division I FBS football season, and featured the second-ranked Florida Gators against the top-ranked Oklahoma Sooners.  The two participants were determined by the BCS Rankings to decide the BCS National Championship.  Television coverage in the United States was provided by Fox, and radio coverage by ESPN Radio.  The game was the last BCS Championship to air on Fox; starting with the 2010 game, ABC or ESPN televised the championship.

Tim Tebow's two touchdown passes and Percy Harvin's two-yard touchdown run led the Florida Gators to their second BCS National Championship in three seasons.  The Gators defeated the Oklahoma Sooners, 24–14, in front of a Dolphin Stadium record crowd of 78,468.

Road to the championship

University of Oklahoma

The Sooners, coached by Bob Stoops, lost one game during their regular season to Texas in the annual Red River Rivalry contest, 45–35 on October 11.  During the regular season, quarterback Sam Bradford, winner of the 2008 Heisman Trophy, led the Sooners on offense to become the highest-scoring team in NCAA history (702 points) and the first team to score 60 or more points in five consecutive games. The game was Oklahoma's fourth BCS Championship appearance.

Scoring summary

Scoring
First quarter
 No scoring
Second quarter
 FLA — Louis Murphy 20-yard pass from Tim Tebow (Jonathan Phillips kick), 14:02 FLA 7 - OKLA 0 (12 plays, 86 yards in 1:20).
 OKLA — Jermaine Gresham 6-yard pass from Sam Bradford (Jimmy Stevens kick), 11:49 FLA 7 - OKLA 7 (6 plays, 65 yards in 2:13).
Third quarter
 FLA — Percy Harvin 2-yard rush (Jonathan Phillips kick), 4:21 FLA 14 - OKLA 7 (13 plays, 75 yds in 5:22).
Fourth quarter
 OKLA — Jermaine Gresham 11-yard pass from Bradford (Jimmy Stevens kick), 12:13 FLA 14 - OKLA 14 (8 plays, 77 yds in 2:36).
 FLA — Jonathan Phillips 27-yard field goal, 10:45 FLA 17 - OKLA 14 (6 plays, 68 yds in 1:28).
 FLA — David Nelson 4-yard pass from Tim Tebow (Jonathan Phillips kick), 3:07 FLA 24 - OKLA 14 (11 plays, 76 yds in 6:52).

Statistics
 Passing: Sam Bradford (#14, QB, OKLA) 256 yards
 Rushing: Percy Harvin (#1, WR, FLA) 121 yards
 Receiving: Jermaine Gresham (#18, TE, OKLA) 62 yards

Game notes
 This was the first meeting between these two teams.
 Both starting quarterbacks were Heisman Trophy recipients.
 Despite both teams having potent offenses (the Gators had averaged over 45 points per game, while the Sooners averaged 54 points per game), neither team scored in the first quarter.
 Quarterbacks Tim Tebow and Sam Bradford combined for four interceptions despite throwing for just eight combined over the course of the regular season.
 The Gators thwarted two Sooners possessions that were inside the five-yard line: a stop on fourth and goal on the one-yard line in the second quarter, and an interception of Bradford's pass at Florida's three-yard line with 6 seconds to play in the first half.
 Despite coming off an ankle injury and declaring himself at "90%", Percy Harvin had nine carries for 122 yards and a touchdown and five receptions for 49 yards. The injury was reported as a high ankle sprain, but Harvin later stated that it was in fact a hairline fracture.
 Jimmy Stevens' 49-yard field goal attempt for the Sooners was blocked in the third quarter.
 Florida was ranked #1 and Oklahoma was ranked #5 in the final AP Top 25 and USA Today Coaches Poll, released after the game.

See also
2008–09 NCAA football bowl games

References

BCS National Championship Game
BCS National Championship Game
Florida Gators football bowl games
Oklahoma Sooners football bowl games
BCS National
BCS National Championship Game
Sports competitions in Miami Gardens, Florida
American football in Florida